The Lualaba River flows entirely within the eastern Democratic Republic of the Congo. It provides the greatest streamflow to the Congo River, while the source of the Congo is recognized as the Chambeshi. Its headwaters are in the country's far southeastern corner near Musofi and Lubumbashi in Katanga Province, next to the Zambian Copperbelt.

Course
The river flows northward to end near Kisangani, where the name Congo River officially begins. From the Katanga plateau it drops, with waterfalls and rapids marking the descent, to the Manika plateau. Near Nzilo Falls it is dammed for hydroelectric power at the Nzilo Dam.

At Bukama in Haut-Lomami District the river becomes navigable for about  through a series of marshy lakes in the lower Upemba Depression, including Lake Upemba and Lake Kisale. Ankoro lies on the west bank of the Lualaba River, opposite its confluence with the Luvua River from the east. Some geographers call the combined river below this point the "Upper Congo".

Below Kongolo, the river becomes unnavigable as it enters the narrow gorge of Portes d'Enfer (Gates of Hell). From Kindu up to the Boyoma Falls at Ubundu, the stream is navigable again for more than 300 kilometres. The river's end is marked after the seventh cataract, near Kisangani, where it becomes the Congo River.

The Lualaba River serves as the northern and western boundary of Upemba National Park, protecting habitats on the Kibara Plateau in Katanga Province of the southeastern Democratic Republic of the Congo.

Tributaries

The largest tributaries of the Lualaba River are:
Ulindi River
Luama River
Lukuga River — drains Lake Tanganyika.
Lufira River
Lubudi River
Luvua River
Elila River
Lowa

Cities and towns

Cities and towns along and near the Lualaba River include:
Ankoro —on west bank, opposite confluence with Luvua River.
Bukama
Kabalo
Kasongo 
Kongolo
Kisangani — near the seventh cataract of Boyoma Falls.
Ubundu — just above first cataract of Boyoma Falls.

History
The Lualaba River was once considered a possible source of the Nile, until Henry Morton Stanley journeyed down it and proved that it drained into the Atlantic Ocean.  Stanley referred to it as the Livingstone.  "Had not Livingstone spoken of the river at Nyangwe as the Lualaba, I should not have mentioned the word except as a corruption by the Waguha of the Wenya term Lu-al-ow-wa..."

French colonial governor Pierre Savorgnan de Brazza also explored the Lualaba.

Notes

References 
Maria Petringa, Brazza, A Life for Africa. Bloomington, IN: AuthorHouse, 2006.

External links

 
Rivers of the Democratic Republic of the Congo
Tributaries of the Congo River
Lake Tanganyika
Haut-Lomami
Lualaba Province
Tanganyika Province